A repeat after me song (also known as an echo song) is a type of song where a leader sings a verse followed by the audience repeating what they say. This is common for campfires, particularly among youth.

See also
Chant

External links
Repeat After Me Songs/Rounds

Song forms